Wayne Arthurs and Paul Hanley were the defending champions but only Hanley 
competed that year with Radek Štěpánek.

Hanley and Štěpánek won in the final 5–7, 7–6(7–5), 7–5 against Jonathan Erlich and Andy Ram.

Seeds
Champion seeds are indicated in bold text while text in italics indicates the round in which those seeds were eliminated.

 Mahesh Bhupathi /  Max Mirnyi (first round)
 Martin Damm /  Cyril Suk (semifinals)
 Wayne Black /  Kevin Ullyett (first round)
 Jared Palmer /  Pavel Vízner (quarterfinals)

Draw

External links
 2004 ABN AMRO World Tennis Tournament Main draw

2004 ABN AMRO World Tennis Tournament
Doubles